Lee Kun-fang (born 1968) is a Taiwanese professional pool player. He came close to winning his first world title at the 1997 WPA World Nine-ball Championship, but the American Johnny Archer defeated him in the final match 9–3. In 1998, Lee won the International Challenge of Champions, defeating Takahashi Kunihiko, a former world champion from Japan. He finished runner-up at the 1997 Philippines Pool Championship.

Titles
 1998 International Challenge of Champions

References

Taiwanese pool players
Living people
1968 births
Place of birth missing (living people)
Cue sports players at the 2002 Asian Games
Cue sports players at the 1998 Asian Games
Asian Games competitors for Chinese Taipei